Uta Schmuck (later Uta Hoffmann, born 19 August 1949) is a retired German swimmer. Born in Limbach-Oberfrohna, Soviet Occupied Zone, she competed for East Germany in the 1968 Summer Olympics.

She qualified for the women's 100 metre freestyle, the women's 4×100 m freestyle relay, and, as part of a team of four that included Helga Lindner, the women's 4×100 m medley relay. She, Roswitha Krause, Gabriele Perthes, and Gabriele Wetzko won a silver medal in the women's 4×100 m freestyle relay. The women's 4×100 m medley relay team came in fifth.

References

External links 

1949 births
Living people
German female swimmers
Olympic swimmers of East Germany
Swimmers at the 1968 Summer Olympics
Olympic silver medalists for East Germany
East German female freestyle swimmers
Medalists at the 1968 Summer Olympics
Olympic silver medalists in swimming